Edwin Rodríguez may refer to:

 Edwin Rodríguez (baseball) (born 1960), baseball manager and former player born in Puerto Rico
 Edwin Rodríguez (boxer) (born 1985), Dominican-American boxer 
 Ed Bassmaster (born 1973), American YouTube personality
 Edwin Rodríguez (footballer) (born 1999), Honduran footballer